A list of songs recorded by English rock band New Order.

List

All members of New Order are Bernard Sumner, Peter Hook, Gillian Gilbert and Stephen Morris, except where noted.

Notes

References

New Order
New Order (band) songs